Convex analysis is the branch of mathematics devoted to the study of properties of convex functions and convex sets, often with applications in convex minimization, a subdomain of optimization theory.

Convex sets 

A subset  of some vector space  is  if it satisfies any of the following equivalent conditions:
If  is real and  then 

Throughout,  will be a map valued in the extended real numbers  with a domain  that is a convex subset of  some vector space. 
The map  is a  if 

holds for any real  and any  with  If this remains true of  when the defining inequality is replaced by the strict inequality 
 

then  is called . 

Convex functions are related to convex sets. Specifically, the function  is convex if and only if its 

is a convex set. The epigraphs of extended real-valued functions play a role in convex analysis that is analogous to the role played by graphs of real-valued function in real analysis. Specifically, the epigraph of an extended real-valued function provides geometric intuition that can be used to help formula or prove conjectures. 

The domain of a function  is denoted by  while its  is the set 
 

 for every 

where  denotes the dot product of these vectors.

Convex conjugate 

Subdifferential set and the Fenchel-Young inequality 

that if  then this definition reduces down to:

 and  

This inequality is an equality (i.e. ) if and only if  It is in this way that the subdifferential set  is directly related to the convex conjugate

Biconjugate 

The  of a function  is the conjugate of the conjugate, typically written as  The biconjugate is useful for showing when strong or weak duality hold (via the perturbation function).

For proper functions,  if and only if  is convex and lower semi-continuous by Fenchel–Moreau theorem.

Convex minimization 

A   is one of the form

find  when given a convex function  and a convex subset

Dual problem 

In optimization theory, the  states that optimization problems may be viewed from either of two perspectives, the primal problem or the dual problem.

In general given two dual pairs separated locally convex spaces  and  Then given the function  we can define the primal problem as finding  such that

If there are constraint conditions, these can be built into the function  by letting  where  is the indicator function.  Then let  be a perturbation function such that 

The  with respect to the chosen perturbation function is given by

where  is the convex conjugate in both variables of 

The duality gap is the difference of the right and left hand sides of the inequality

This principle is the same as weak duality.  If the two sides are equal to each other, then the problem is said to satisfy strong duality.

There are many conditions for strong duality to hold such as:
 the primal problem is a linear optimization problem;
 Slater's condition for a convex optimization problem.

Lagrange duality 
For a convex minimization problem with inequality constraints,

the Lagrangian dual problem is

where the objective function  is the Lagrange dual function defined as follows:

See also

Notes

References

External links

 

 
Analysis